Mihai-Lucian Grünberg (born April 29, 1976) is a Romanian International Master in chess and the champion of Romania (2003).

He is the son of Sergiu Henric Grünberg, a former Romanian chess champion. In 2005, Grünberg represented Romania at the Maccabiah Games.

References

External links

1976 births
Living people
Romanian Jews
Romanian chess players
Jewish chess players
Maccabiah Games competitors for Romania
Maccabiah Games chess players
Chess International Masters